Ruda is an uninhabited islet in Croatia, part of the Elaphiti Islands archipelago off the coast of southern Dalmatia, near Dubrovnik. It is located between the islands of Lopud and Šipan. Its area is 0.296 km2 and its coastline is 2.37 km long. The highest point on Ruda is 81 m high.

References

Islets of Croatia
Islands of the Adriatic Sea
Uninhabited islands of Croatia
Elaphiti Islands